Julian Cherel (born 8 March 1983) is a French former professional footballer who last played as a defender for Northwich Victoria.

Career
Cherel signed for Hartlepool United in September 2009, following a successful trial. Before joining Hartlepool he had a trial with Conference National club Altrincham. On signing for Hartlepool, he said; "The Manager is cool and all the players are cool and now I want to do as well as I can for the team and get them further up the table".

He made his debut for Hartlepool on 2 January 2010 in the 2–1 League One home win over Oldham Athletic. Oldham Athletic manager Paul Dickov confirmed on 19 September, that Cherel was playing on non-contract terms. On 6 October 2010, Cherel signed for Mansfield Town on a non-contract basis.

Cherel signed a short-term contract with Northwich Victoria in October 2010, making his debut against Glapwell in the FA Trophy Second Qualifying Round on 30 October."

References

External links
Hartlepool United profile
Julian Cherel profile at Vital Hartlepool

1983 births
Living people
French footballers
Stade Malherbe Caen players
Hartlepool United F.C. players
Mansfield Town F.C. players
Northwich Victoria F.C. players
English Football League players
Footballers from Caen
Association football defenders